KLGR 1490 AM is a radio station licensed to Redwood Falls, Minnesota.  The station broadcasts a country music format and is owned by Digity, LLC, through licensee Digity 3E License, LLC. The station is also heard on 95.9 FM, through a translator in Redwood Falls, Minnesota.

Translator

References

External links
KLGR's website

Country radio stations in the United States
Radio stations in Minnesota